Duchess of Sweden may refer to:
Ingeborg, Princess of Sweden, Duchess of Sweden 1248–1254, it is unknown whether this was a primary title in its own right or adopted as consort of Birger Jarl
Matilda of Holstein, Duchess of Sweden 1261–1288 as second consort and widow of Birger Jarl